James Sanders (5 July 1920 – 11 August 2003) was an English footballer who played as a goalkeeper, most notably for West Bromwich Albion.

Biography 
Sanders joined Charlton Athletic from Cray Wanderers towards the end of the Second World War but found his progress hampered by both the outbreak of the war and the presence of Addicks legend Sam Bartram. His war service was spent with the Royal Air Force, for whom he was a gunner pilot before being invalided out. Deprived of playing time due to the presence of Bartram, he appeared as a guest player for Chelsea, Liverpool, Southampton and West Ham United before guesting for Albion, earning himself a £2,250 move to the Hawthorns. Sanders established himself as number one at the club until 1952 when he lost out to Norman Heath, although he continued to feature intermittently until his departure in 1958. He followed this with brief spells at Kettering Town, Coventry City and Hinckley Athletic before retiring in 1960. Following his retirement he left football to pursue a career in the pub trade, although he was distinguished by usually wearing his 1954 FA Cup Final winners medal around his neck.

References 
 

1920 births
2003 deaths
Footballers from Hackney, London
English footballers
Association football goalkeepers
Charlton Athletic F.C. players
West Bromwich Albion F.C. players
Kettering Town F.C. players
Cray Wanderers F.C. players
Coventry City F.C. players
Hinckley Athletic F.C. players
Chelsea F.C. wartime guest players
Liverpool F.C. wartime guest players
West Ham United F.C. wartime guest players
Royal Air Force personnel of World War II
FA Cup Final players